Sandsøya is an island in Sande Municipality in Møre og Romsdal county, Norway.  The  island lies west of the island of Gurskøya, north of the island of Voksa, and northeast of the island of Kvamsøya.  The main village on the island is Sandshamn on the eastern shore.  The Sande Church is located on the southern shore.  The island is connected to the island of Voksa to the south by a  bridge/road/causeway.  There is a ferry connection from Voksa to the mainland, to Kvamsøya, and to the village of Larsnes on Gurskøya island.

See also
List of islands of Norway

References

Islands of Møre og Romsdal
Sande, Møre og Romsdal